Salvador Dubois Leiva (16 August 1935 – 11 July 2015) was a Nicaraguan footballer, who was considered one of the best goalkeepers that played for the Nicaragua national football team and Honduran powerhouse F.C. Motagua.

Club career
He started his career at Santa Cecilia and moved abroad to play for Honduran giants F.C. Motagua for whom he would play 92 league matches. He returned to Nicaragua for a final season at América 5 years later.

International career
Dubois represented Nicaragua at the 1975 Pan American Games.

Managerial career
Dubois managed Nicaragua and several clubs in Nicaragua at different levels. After three years working for the (Nicaraguan FA (FENIFUT)) as Academy supervisor, he also joined Walter Ferretti as goalkeeper coach.

References

External links
 Salón de la Fama (Bio) - Manfut 
 Salvador Dubois sigue en el fútbol, ahora como técnico - El Nuevo Diario 

1935 births
2015 deaths
People from Chontales Department
Association football goalkeepers
Nicaraguan men's footballers
Nicaragua international footballers
F.C. Motagua players
Nicaraguan expatriate footballers
Expatriate footballers in Honduras
Nicaraguan expatriate sportspeople in Honduras
Liga Nacional de Fútbol Profesional de Honduras players
Pan American Games competitors for Nicaragua
Footballers at the 1975 Pan American Games
Nicaraguan football managers
Nicaragua national football team managers